The Modena trolleybus system forms part of the public transport network of the city and comune of Modena, in the region of Emilia-Romagna, northern Italy.

In operation since 1950, the system has undergone several phases of expansion and contraction over the decades, including a re-launching since the start of 2000.  It presently comprises three lines, and is one of the largest trolleybus systems in Italy.

History

Beginnings
In 1949, the comune of Modena decided to replace the city's tram network with a trolleybus system, believed to be more efficient and modern. The first two lines of the planned system (3-barrato Centro - San Faustino and 5 Viale Buon Pastore - San Cataldo) were opened on 22 January 1950. In the following months, the system was expanded gradually at the expense of the trams, with all of the initial lines (1 to 5) opening by 21 October 1950.

In 1952, after almost two years of service, it became necessary to revise the system, in light of observed traffic flows.  Line 5 was extended, and there was a new line 6.

On 30 September 1954, a new line 7 was opened (Piazza Torre - Via Farini - Sacca), to provide a proper service to the new Sacca district, located north of the Milan–Bologna railway.  This line remained in operation for little more than one year; the comune lacked the resources to extend the line westward to the village of Madonnina (and in particular to equip the homonymous overpass with overhead wires).  The line was therefore operated by conventional buses until 1959, when the Madonnina extension was finally electrified, and the opportunity was taken for a second reorganisation of the system.

Expansion and contraction

In later years, new extensions came into service, but were accompanied by the first closures.  Conventional buses were starting to be seen as more flexible, at intersections as traffic became chaotic, and in enabling Modena's transport network to cover urban expansion without the need for new infrastructure.

Specifically, on 8 December 1963 line 6 was extended to the Sacca district, to serve the new INA Casa public housing district, and on 14 June 1965 line 4 was "temporarily" suspended, to allow the construction of the Crocetta overpass (on which it was planned to install the overhead wire to extend the line).  Then, on 24 July 1965, the line was diverted to the new hospital (Policlinico).  The line along la Crocetta was abandoned, and later permanently deleted (on 18 June 1966) and replaced by the new line 7, routed via Largo Porta Sant'Agostino to Modena railway station, and following the new routing at Viale Monte Kosica.  Also, line 4 to Madonnina was abandoned.

On 2 October 1967, an extension of line 6 was inaugurated from Viale Buon Pastore to Via Conco, including a level crossing over the SEFTA line to Sassuolo. This extension was constructed from scratch. The following years saw only contraction of Modena's trolleybus system.  The closure in 1964 of the railway to Mirandola, and the planned closure (implemented in 1969) of the railway to Vignola, reduced the importance of Modena's "little station" (Modena Piazza Manzoni railway station), and trolleybus lines 1 and 2. Both lines were therefore closed on 21 August 1968, together with line 3, which was transformed into a conventional bus line and extended.  Finally, on 2 October 1972, under the pretext of converting Viale Fabrizi to one-way traffic, line 5 was closed.

Austerity
The long sequence of closures was stopped, at least in part, by the so-called austerity, and the concomitant spread of ecological awareness.  Indeed, the scarcity of fuel available for private traffic had necessitated increased frequency of public transport.  However, to avoid excessively intensive bus traffic in the streets of Old Town, it was decided to divert the conventional buses onto the ring roads.  This left only the trolleybuses in the city centre, to operate the two north-south and east-west bus lines, the high frequency lines.  Limited availability of trolleybuses enabled the continued operation of the important line 7, but forced the closure of line 6.  The reform came into force on 1 October 1973.

Less than a year later, on 15 June 1974, a further change took place, transforming line 7 and extending the EO shuttle bus service to the railway station.  At the end of the period of austerity, after the need to ensure high frequencies, the EW and NS shuttles could be deleted, and lines 6 and 7 reactivated.  The line 6 trolleybus assumed the designation 6-barrato (abbreviated as "6/"), being the reinforcement of a longer, conventional bus route.  The network was then stable for nearly two decades, because all of the investment funds of AMCM (absorbed in 1988 by ATCM) were directed, throughout the 1980s, to the renewal of the fleet of trolleybuses.  However, despite the receipt of 14 new Socimi trolleybuses (with Iveco chassis) in 1986, aging infrastructure and other issues made the use of trolleybuses sporadic by the 1990s, and on route 6-barrato it ceased entirely in 1993, leaving only route 7 trolleybus-operated.

Revival
In the mid-1990s, the outlook for the trolleybus system improved greatly, as a plan (known as the "Husler Plan", after its editor, the Swiss engineer Willi Husler) was prepared for the reform of the entire system.  It provided for upgrades and extensions, and the opportunity was taken to rebuild the system to the most modern dictates, by reconstructing the overhead wire to make it suitable for higher speeds, and increasing the voltage from 600 V to 750 V.
All of these extensive works necessitated the suspension of all trolleybus service from 30 October 1995 until May 2000.  In addition to the infrastructure upgrade and expansion, fleet improvements were also approved.  ATCM placed an order for 10 new articulated, low-floor trolleybuses with Modena-based Autodromo (with MAN chassis), and also made plans to refurbish the 14 Socimi vehicles, which needed modification to enable them to operate at the planned higher voltage.  The Socimi trolleybuses were also fitted with auxiliary batteries permitting limited movement away from the overhead trolley wiring.  The first Autodromo vehicle was delivered in spring 1999.

In 2000, trolleybus service in Modena resumed after a nearly four-year suspension.  The return of trolleybuses was ceremonially marked on 13 May 2000 by the operation of two decorated Autodromo trolleybuses through the city centre, without passengers, and the display of a preserved vintage Modena trolleybus, 1959-built Fiat/Cansa no. 33.  The actual resumption of trolleybus service occurred two days later, on Monday, 15 May 2000, with the reopening of the renovated line 7. The new Autodromo articulated trolleybuses entered service on that date.

The reopening of line 6 to trolleybuses followed on 13 November 2000, now operating Sant'Anna – city centre – Via Forlì, bringing into use new wiring along Corso Canal Grande (in place of Via Farini) in the city centre and extensions at both ends: from Sacca to Sant'Anna and from Viale Buon Pastore to Via Forlì. ATCM had opened a large new depot (garage) at Sant'Anna in 1996.  The refurbished Socimi trolleybuses of 1986 returned to service at that time.

The final stage of the trolleybus system's major renovation and expansion was completed on 11 June 2001, with the conversion of bus route 11 to trolleybuses.  This change coincided with a reorganization of routes, such that route 11 took over the city centre – Sant'Anna portion of route 6, and the latter was diverted north/west of the city centre to instead run to Via Santi (also known as Uffici Comunali), a new route section which opened to trolleybuses on that date.  Another newly built trolleybus extension that opened on 11 June 2001 was to Via Gramsci, which had been served by motorbus route 11, but concurrent with its conversion to trolleybuses, became instead served by a route 7, extended north from Stazione FS.  These openings and route changes resulted in the trolleybus network comprising the following three routes on weekdays and Saturday mornings:  
 6: Via Santi – Viale Berengario – Piazza Roma (Accademia) – Via Forlì
 7: Via Gramsci – Stazione FS – Autostazione (intercity bus station) – Policlinico
 11: Sant'Anna – Stazione FS – Autostazione (intercity bus station) – Viale dello Zodiaco

On Saturday afternoons and Sundays, lines 6 and 7 were replaced by lines 60 and 70, which had routings intended to avoid a section of Via Emilia in the city centre which was pedestrianised at those times. (These were renumbered 6A and 7A in 2007.)

In detail, in addition to the reconstruction of the two old lines 6-barrato and 7, the 1996–2000 construction programme including creation of the following new sections of trolleybus route from scratch:
 Staz. Autolinee (also known as Autostazione) - Via Santi, which largely follows the line 5 branch line to San Cataldo that was closed in 1972;
 extension from Via Conco (near Buon Pastore terminus) to Via Forlì;
 Viale Berengario;
 Corso Canal Grande (in place of Via Farini);
 Sacca overpass - Viale Gramsci;
 extension from Sacca to Sant'Anna;
 new line from Piazzale Risorgimento to Viale dello Zodiaco, including the line 3 branch line to San Faustino closed in 1968.

Post-2001
On 2 July 2007, route 7 was extended from the Hospital (Policlinico) east to Via Gottardi, partly running along private roads through the hospital grounds, but temporarily converted to motorbuses pending certification of the new wiring;  trolleybus service on the new extension was introduced on 8 October 2007.  Also on 2 July, routes 6 and 11 were revised in the city centre, with route 6 no longer serving the railway station, leaving unused the relatively new wiring along Viale Berengario, and route 11 taking over from route 6 the service along Corso Canal Grande and via Piazza Roma.  The outer termini of both routes were unchanged.

Effective 1 January 2012, a reorganization saw the replacement of Azienda Trasporti Collettivi e Mobilita (ATCM)IT by Società Emiliana Trasporti Autofiloviari S.p.A. (SETA)IT as the operator of all urban transit service in Modena.

The service was extended on 11 April, but temporarily using diesel buses, and regular operation with trolleybuses did not begin until 15 May 2012.

Services
On Mondays to Fridays and on Saturday mornings, the routes comprising the present Modena trolleybus system are as follows:

On Saturday afternoons and Sundays, routes 6, 7 and 11 are replaced by 6A, 7A and 11A.  Route 6A terminates at Autostazione, not serving the section to Via Santi.  Routes 7A and 11A are designed to avoid the section of Via Emilia that is pedestrianised at these times (between Corso Duomo and Corso Canal Grande), and they essentially exchange their city-centre routings.  Route 7A is diverted via Piazza Roma, and 11A is diverted via Autostazione, but all four of their outer termini are unchanged.

Fleet

Past fleet
The following trolleybuses have been used on the Modena system, but are now retired:
Fiat 668/F 122 Cansa CGE (4 trolleybuses, nos. 11-14), originally destined for Catania;
Fiat 668/F 131 Cansa Marelli (12 trolleybuses, nos. 15-26), entered service between 1949 and 1950 - the last remaining were retired in 1972, upon the closure of line 5; no. 17 was bought by a private purchaser, and is still visible, although in poor condition, in a private forest at Serramazzoni (MO);
Fiat 2401 Cansa Marelli: (2 trolleybuses, nos. 27-28), entered service in 1953 - due to several problems with the steering and electrical systems, these units were withdrawn in 1967;
Fiat 2411 Cansa CGE (6 trolleybuses, nos. 29-34), registered in 1959 - the last units ceased service in 1986; no. 33, was maintained for training drivers until the end of the 1980s, and has been preserved as a historic vehicle - after a careful external restoration, it is now located at the outdoor storage of ATCM Modena;
Fiat 2411 Menarini Marelli (6 trolleybuses, nos. 35-41), acquired in 1964, served until 1986 - no. 37, when retired, was taken to the National Museum of Transport in La Spezia, where it still awaits restoration;
 Fiat 2411 Cansa CGE (4 trolleybuses, nos. 42-45 (ex-61, 62, 63 and 65 ATAM Livorno)), purchased upon the closure of the Livorno trolleybus system in 1974 - retired in 1986, and were purchased in 1991 by the Dopolavoro Ferroviario di Livorno for museum purposes.
 Iveco 2471 Socimi F8833 (14 trolleybuses, nos. 11–24), entered service in 1986; Retired at the end of 2019

Current fleet
Modena's present trolleybus fleet is made up of only the following three types:

 Autodromo BusOtto, with MAN NGT 204F chassis (10 articulated trolleybuses, nos. 25–34), entered service in 2000;
 Neoplan Electroliner N6316 (5 trolleybuses, nos. 01–05); built 2007–08 and entered service in late 2008 (01–03) and August 2009 (04–05).
 Viseon Bus Electroliner N6316 (2 trolleybuses, nos. 06–07); built 2009–10, but did not enter service until October 2013.

The Neoplan and Viseon vehicles are almost identical and were built in the same factory. The last two vehicles (nos. 06–07) were ordered from Neoplan in 2008, but in early 2009 Neoplan's production of trolleybuses and special-purpose buses was spun off as a separate company, Viseon Bus, including the designs and production facilities. Modena trolleybuses 06–07 were built by Viseon in 2009–10 and delivered in July 2010, but then were returned to the factory for modifications, and did not finally enter service until 2013.

See also

Modena railway station
List of trolleybus systems in Italy

Sources

References

Books

External links

 History of the system, on the SETA official site 
 English version of SETA website (much less information than the Italian version; see infobox above for the main address)
 Images of the Modena trolleybus system, at photorail.com

Where inline citations are absent, this article is based upon a translation of the Italian language version as at July 2011.

Modena
Modena
Modena
Transport in Emilia-Romagna
1950 establishments in Italy